Louis Constant was a French boxer. He competed in the men's featherweight event at the 1908 Summer Olympics. At the 1908 Summer Olympics, he lost to Thomas Ringer of Great Britain.

References

Year of birth missing
Year of death missing
French male boxers
Olympic boxers of France
Boxers at the 1908 Summer Olympics
Place of birth missing
Featherweight boxers